The Tyrone county football team represents Tyrone GAA, the county board of the Gaelic Athletic Association, in the Gaelic sport of football. The team competes in the three major annual inter-county competitions; the All-Ireland Senior Football Championship, the Ulster Senior Football Championship and the National Football League.

Tyrone's home ground is Healy Park, Omagh. The team's managers are Feargal Logan and Brian Dooher.

The team last won the Ulster Senior Championship in 2021, the All-Ireland Senior Championship in 2021 and the National League in 2003.

History

Pre-Harte era: 1956–2002
Tyrone won its first Ulster Senior Football Championship (SFC) in 1956, defending it successfully in 1957. The county did not win a third Ulster SFC title until 1973. The Tyrone minor team, however, won the All-Ireland Minor Football Championship (MFC) in 1947, 1948 and 1973. 1973 is remembered because Frank McGuigan, who captained the minor team, was also part of the under-21 and senior teams which won their respective Ulster Championships.

The Tyrone team of the mid-eighties included McGuigan, Eugene McKenna, Plunkett Donaghy and John Lynch, winning a fourth Ulster SFC title in 1984, and in 1986, reaching a first ever final of the All-Ireland Senior Football Championship (SFC), where Kerry defeated it by a scoreline of 2–15 to 1–10. Tyrone added a sixth Ulster SFC (after a replay of the final) in 1989.

However, All-Ireland SFC success eluded Tyrone and the county watched as its Ulster rivals won an unprecedented four consecutive national titles in the early 1990s (two titles for Down bookending one title for Donegal, as well as Derry's only title).

Tyrone would reach the 1994 Ulster SFC final to lose to eventual All-Ireland winners Down; however, Tyrone's forward Peter Canavan was Ulster's top scorer, winning his first All Star Award. The following year Tyrone had its turn at being Ulster champions and, in keeping with the recent form of the winners of that competition, reached the 1995 All-Ireland Senior Football Championship Final (only the county's second ever). Dublin emerged as victors by a scoreline of 1–10 to 0–12, in a match that was notable both for Canavan scoring 11 of Tyrone's 12 points, and for Dublin's Charlie Redmond failing to leave the pitch for a full minute after being sent off for a foul. In 1996, Tyrone again met Down in the Ulster SFC final, this time emerging as the winner. However, the county fell at the 1996 All-Ireland SFC semi-final stage to a Meath team "who bullied them in a way that left the losers with a reputation for softness", according to one commentator.

In 1998, the county won the All-Ireland MFC final for the first time in fifteen years, with a team that included future senior team players Cormac McAnallen, Stephen O'Neill and Ryan McMenamin. McAnallen also captained the county's under-21 team to successive All-Ireland Under-21 Football Championship titles in 2000 and 2001.

However, having won an Ulster SFC, Tyrone and its young team "folded in the face of a rugged Derry challenge" in the 2001 All-Ireland SFC quarter-final. Further decline followed with a season in which Sligo "ran Tyrone ragged" during an All-Ireland SFC qualifier.

Harte era: 2002–2020
2003 brought the introduction of a new Tyrone manager, Mickey Harte. Harte's team eventually overcame Down in the Ulster SFC final, requiring a replay, when Harte switched McAnallen from midfield to full-back. Tyrone won against Fermanagh in the All-Ireland SFC quarter-final, before overcoming Kerry in the semi-final by a scoreline of 0–13 to 0–6. Canavan limped off injured early in that game and television expert Pat Spillane deemed Tyrone's approach during the second half of the semi-final to be "puke football". The 2003 All-Ireland SFC final was Tyrone's third and had the county pitted against rival and neighbouring county Armagh, the reigning All-Ireland SFC champions (Armagh had also beaten Tyrone to the title). It was the first All-Ireland SFC final between sides from the same province. Canavan was still injured but Harte decided to have him feature from the start; Canavan scored five points from frees before being substituted at half-time, later to re-emerge onto the pitch in the closing moments as Tyrone held a narrow lead. Tyrone won by a scoreline of 0–12 to 0–09 and lifted the Sam Maguire Cup for the first time. 2003 also saw Tyrone win the National Football League for a second successive year.

Tragedy struck the following year with the sudden death of Cormac McAnallen, at the age of 24.

Tyrone, however, came back the following year to win the All-Ireland SFC for a second time. The county played a total of ten matches, including three replays, which was a record for any winning team. Tyrone played five matches in the Ulster SFC, including replays against Cavan in the semi-final and against Armagh in the final, which they lost. That replay was later described by one commentator as "perhaps the most mean-spirited match played since Dublin–Galway's 1983 All-Ireland final meeting and seemed to confirm the widespread idea that the game was tending towards a zero point of cynicism and negativity". Having to contest an All-Ireland SFC qualifier as a result of that loss, Tyrone overcame Monaghan to reach an All-Ireland SFC quarter-final against Dublin. Tyrone had yet another drawn game, a match notable for Owen Mulligan's stunning solo goal. Manager Harte combined Enda McGinley with Joe McMahon for the second half, a move which outwitted Ciarán Whelan, who had been getting the better of his opponents in the first half; Whelan was ultimately removed from the game by Dublin. In the All-Ireland SFC semi-final, the county met Armagh for a third time; two points behind with only six minutes of play left, Seán Cavanagh scored a solo point, substitute Shane Sweeney levelled the game and Peter Canavan converted an injury-time free. Tyrone won by a scoreline of 1–13 to 1–12. In the 2005 All-Ireland SFC final, the county defeated Kerry for the second time in three years to win the Sam Maguire Cup, sparking emotional scenes among the Tyrone team and fans, in remembrance of Cormac McAnallen.

Tyrone won its eleventh Ulster SFC title in 2007, but lost to Meath in the All-Ireland SFC quarter-final.

The county lost its opening game of the 2008 Ulster SFC, a quarter-final to Down. Entering the All-Ireland SFC qualifiers again, the county's progress went largely unnoticed until it reached the All-Ireland SFC quarter-final, where Tyrone hammered Dublin by 12 points. The team advanced to the All-Ireland SFC semi-final against Wexford but did not impress against the Strawberries, appearing in at that stage for the first time since 1945. Tyrone did enough though, but entered 2008 All-Ireland SFC final against a Kerry team then bidding to win three consecutive titles. Kerry did not. Despite Peter Canavan's retirement, Mulligan's disciplinary problems and O'Neill's on-off retirement through injury, Tyrone prevailed to win a third All-Ireland SFC title. Tyrone defeated Kerry by a scoreline of 1–15 to 0–14. Justin McMahon dealt with Kerry's new weapon, Kieran Donaghy, while the half-back line of David Harte, Conor Gormley and Philip Jordan outperformed expectations from outside the county and Cavanagh scored five points from play.

Tyrone reached All-Ireland SFC semi-finals in 2009, 2013, 2015, 2017 and 2019, only for Cork, Mayo, Kerry, Dublin and Kerry (again) to beat it respectively. A shock All-Ireland SFC quarter-final loss to Dublin occurred in 2010.

Tyrone won its fifteenth Ulster SFC in 2017. But that year's All-Ireland SFC semi-final defeat was by a margin of 12 points. It reached the 2018 All-Ireland Senior Football Championship Final but Dublin defeated it again.

Harte's final championship game ended in defeat to Donegal in the 2020 Ulster SFC quarter-final and, with no All-Ireland SFC qualifiers due to the impact of the COVID-19 pandemic on Gaelic games, Tyrone's championship ended after one game.

Dooher and Logan era: 2020–
Harte departed as manager in November 2020. A short while later, Feargal Logan and Brian Dooher succeeded him. Logan had been tipped to take sole charge but Dooher joined him. Both were previously in charge of the county's under-21 team in 2015. Peter Canavan had also been involved with the 2015 under-21 team but had earlier ruled himself out due to family involvement.

Like Harte's appointment, the Dooher and Logan managerial ticket was immediately successful, with the team winning an unexpected 2021 All-Ireland SFC in its first year. Dooher became the fifth manager to win an All-Ireland SFC after earlier captaining his county to victory in the same competition (and the first since Páidí Ó Sé in 1997). Conor McKenna became the fourth former AFL player to win the Sam Maguire Cup.

Support
Tyrone has its own supporters' club, called Club Tyrone, which was established in 1995. Unlike supporters' clubs in other counties, it is a sub-committee of the county board and focuses on fundraising. By 2016, it had raised several million pounds and received regular sums of £500 from close to 500 individual supporters each year.

Current panel

Current management team
Appointed on a three-year term in November 2020:
Co-managers: Feargal Logan and Brian Dooher
Coaches: Colin Holmes and Joe McMahon
Strength and conditioning coach: Peter Donnelly

Managerial history
Tyrone — like Cork, Dublin and Kerry — traditionally appoints managers from inside, rather than seeking a "foreign" appointment.

Players

Notable players

Records
Frankie Donnelly holds the record for the highest individual scoring tally in an inter-county match, with 4–11 against Fermanagh in the 1957 Dr Lagan Cup.
Upon retiring, Seán Cavanagh held the all-time outfield appearances record in championship football, with 89 appearances for his county.

Most appearances
The following are among those to have made the highest number of appearances for the senior team:

All Stars

Kit evolution

Honours
Official honours, with additions noted.

National
All-Ireland Senior Football Championship
 Winners (4): 2003, 2005, 2008, 2021
 Runners-up (3): 1986, 1995, 2018
National Football League:
 Winners (2): 2002, 2003
 Runners-up (2): 1991–92, 2013
National Football League Division Two
 Winners (2): 1972–73, 2016
All-Ireland Junior Football Championship
 Winners (1): 1968
All-Ireland Under-21 Football Championship
 Winners (5): 1991, 1992, 2000, 2001, 2015
All-Ireland Under-20 Football Championship
 Winners (1): 2022
All-Ireland Minor Football Championship
 Winners (8): 1947, 1948, 1973, 1998, 2001, 2004, 2008, 2010
All-Ireland Under-17 Football Championship
 Winners (1): 2017
All-Ireland Vocational Schools Championship
 Winners (9): 1967, 1969, 1970, 1988, 1989, 1998, 2004, 2005, 2007

Provincial
Ulster Senior Football Championship
 Winners (16): 1956, 1957, 1973, 1984, 1986, 1989, 1995, 1996, 2001, 2003, 2007, 2009, 2010, 2016, 2017, 2021
 Runners-up (7): 1890, 1941, 1972, 1980, 1988, 1994, 2005
Dr McKenna Cup
 Winners (17): 1957, 1973, 1978, 1982, 1984, 2004, 2005, 2006, 2007, 2012, 2013, 2014, 2015, 2016, 2017, 2019, 2020
Dr Lagan Cup
 Winners (3): 1943, 1957, 1958
Ulster Junior Football Championship
 Winners (3): 1968, 1983, 1986
Ulster Under-21 Football Championship
 Winners (12): 1972, 1973, 1980, 1990, 1991, 1992, 2000, 2001, 2002, 2003, 2006, 2015
Ulster Under-20 Football Championship
 Winners (1): 2022
Ulster Minor Football Championship
 Winners (25): 1931, 1934, 1946, 1947, 1948, 1967, 1971, 1972, 1973, 1975, 1976, 1978, 1988, 1993, 1997, 1998, 2001, 2003, 2004, 2007, 2008, 2010, 2012, 2021, 2022

Other
RTÉ Sports Team of the Year Award
 Winners (1): 2005

References

External links
 Teamtalkmag.com — the online Tyrone news outlet
 Tyrone Tribulations — the online Tyrone news outlet

 
County football teams